Jaalakam is a 1987 Indian Malayalam film, directed by Harikumar and produced by M. Chandrika. The film stars Ashokan, Parvathy Jayaram, Srividya, Jagathy Sreekumar and Innocent in the lead roles. The film has musical score by M. G. Radhakrishnan.

Plot 
Appu is a wayward college going youth not interested in anything and constantly irritated by his relatives at home and a loner at college. His father works in the military and mother constantly dotes on him to change his ways. His father Vijayan’s Sister and her husband trick their mother into registering their family home under her sister Savitri’s name even if Vijayan had spent his life savings into renovating his house. Appu gets in to trouble one day with his professor since he scolds Appu for not listening to the class. This tiff is capitalized by the right-wing student party members who take Appu under their wings, planning to use his waywardness for their end. They are constantly picking troubles with the left-wing party which currently rules the college union. When an ex-student of the college and left activist Menon comes to visit the professor at college, Appu’s friends Kuzhiveli and gang oppose this, accusing the professor of favoriting the other party. In the ensuing tiff Appu gets angry and manhandles the professor, resulting in him being suspended from college. Vijayan reprimands him severely to which he reacts rather rebelliously, and his mother Lakshmi asks him to leave the house. Angry and upset, he takes refuge in the college hostel.

Eventually his union friends successfully threaten the principal into taking Appu back to college and cancel his suspension. Appu comes back home, tries to mend his ways, and even gets romantically involved with his neighborhood sweetheart Latha. However, Latha backs out of the relationship when a rich expat’s alliance comes for her citing Appu’s present situation and the disagreement of her family due to the same reasons. Meanwhile at college Kuzhiveli and gang were looking for a chance to get back at the left-wing group who had trashed on of their gang members earlier. They had done it in retaliation when that person had arranged and bashed up the ex-student and their leader Menon who had earlier came to visit the professor. They take advantage of Appu’s mental agony and trick him into a fight with the opposition guys. In the ensuing scuffle Appu accidentally stabs an innocent student in the library, killing him. Appu goes behind bars and Lakshmi dies heart broken. Appu breaks down in front of his father after seeing him at his mother’s funeral and goes back to jail.

Cast
Ashokan as Appu V. Nair
Parvathy Jayaram as Latha
Murali as Shivankutty
M. G. Soman as Vijayan Nair
Srividya as Lekshmikutty
Sukumari as Devaki
Jagathy Sreekumar
Innocent as Gopikurup
KPAC Lalitha as Savathri
Sreenathas Anchal Sasi
Babu Namboothiri
Jagadish as Kuzhuveli
T. P. Madhavan
Rajam K. Nair

Soundtrack
The music was composed by M. G. Radhakrishnan and the lyrics were written by O. N. V. Kurup.

References

External links
 

1987 films
1980s Malayalam-language films